Maharashtra National Law University, Aurangabad (MNLU Aurangabad, MNLUA) is a National Law University in Aurangabad, Maharashtra, India. It was established in 2017 by the Government of Maharashtra, the third and final university to be installed through the Maharashtra National Law University Act, 2014 following Maharashtra National Law University, Mumbai and Maharashtra National Law University, Nagpur, the 21st  National Law University in India. The Chancellor of the university is  Chief Justice of India, Supreme Court of India and the Vice-Chancellor is K. V. S. Sarma.

Academics
MNLU Aurangabad offers 60 seats for Bachelor of Laws (Hons.) degree. It offers one year L.L.M. in constitutional and corporate law. Admission is through Common Law Admission Test (CLAT).

Campus
Land for the  permanent campus for the university was identified at Karodi in the outskirts of Aurangabad. The university currently operates from a temporary setup at the Government College of Education, Aurangabad. Hostel facilities are provided at Kanchanwadi, a locality of Aurangabad.

References

External links

Law schools in Maharashtra
National Law Universities
Universities in Maharashtra
Education in Aurangabad, Maharashtra
Educational institutions established in 2017
2017 establishments in Maharashtra